, also romanized as Nimpyō, was a  after Kyūan and before Kyūju. This period spanned the years from January 1151 through October 1154.

Change of era
 January 20, 1151 : The new era name was created to mark an event or series of events. The previous era ended and a new one commenced in Kyūan 10, on the 26th day of the 1st month of 1151.

Events of the Ninpei era
 1151 (Ninpei 1, 1st month): Sadaijin Fujiwara no Yorinaga was given additional powers in the imperial court as "Naï-ken," which gave him the duty and opportunity of reading formal written requests before they should be presented to the emperor. This had been amongst the powers of the Sesshō or the Kampaku. Factions in the court who favored Yorinaga tended to dislike Daijō Daijin Fujiwara Tadamichi, and they employed any means possible to help elevate Yorinaga's position. However, Yorinaga was himself generally disliked because of his capricious character. his tactics and strategy for enhancing his own prestige were focused primarily on diminishing Tadamichi's role in the court.
 April 13, 1152 (Ninpei 2, 7th day of the 3rd month): Emperor Konoe visited the home of Emperor Toba-no-Hōō to celebrate his father's 50th birthday; and the emperor stayed until the next day, amusing himself with dances and with listening to musical performances.
 January 28, 1153 (Ninpei 3, 2nd day of the 1st month): Konoe visited his father's home; and in the same month Taira Tadamori, the head of the criminal tribunal, died; and this position was soon filed by his son, Taira Kiyomori.

Notes

References
 Brown, Delmer M. and Ichirō Ishida, eds. (1979).  Gukanshō: The Future and the Past. Berkeley: University of California Press. ;  OCLC 251325323
 Nussbaum, Louis-Frédéric and Käthe Roth. (2005).  Japan encyclopedia. Cambridge: Harvard University Press. ;  OCLC 58053128
 Titsingh, Isaac. (1834). Nihon Odai Ichiran; ou,  Annales des empereurs du Japon.  Paris: Royal Asiatic Society, Oriental Translation Fund of Great Britain and Ireland. OCLC 5850691
 Varley, H. Paul. (1980). A Chronicle of Gods and Sovereigns: Jinnō Shōtōki of Kitabatake Chikafusa. New York: Columbia University Press. ;  OCLC 6042764

External links
 National Diet Library, "The Japanese Calendar" -- historical overview plus illustrative images from library's collection

Japanese eras